A supergroup is a musical group whose members are successful as solo artists or as members of other successful groups. The term became popular in the late 1960s when members of already successful rock groups recorded albums together, after which they normally disband. Charity supergroups, in which prominent musicians perform or record together in support of a particular cause, have been common since the 1980s. The term is most common in the context of rock and pop music, but it has occasionally been applied to other musical genres. For example, opera superstars The Three Tenors (José Carreras, Plácido Domingo, and Luciano Pavarotti) have been called a supergroup.

A supergroup sometimes forms as a side project for a single recording project or other ad hoc purposes, with no intention that the group will remain together afterwards. In other instances, the group may become the primary focus of the members' career.

History
Rolling Stone editor Jann Wenner credited British rock band Cream, which came together in 1966, as the first supergroup. Eric Clapton, formerly of rock band The Yardbirds and blues rock band John Mayall & the Bluesbreakers; Jack Bruce, formerly of jazz/rhythm and blues band the Graham Bond Organisation (GBO) and John Mayall & the Bluesbreakers; and Ginger Baker, formerly of the GBO, formed the band in 1966, recorded four albums, and disbanded in 1968. Guitarist Clapton and drummer Baker went on to form Blind Faith, another blues rock supergroup which recruited former the Spencer Davis Group and Traffic singer, keyboardist, and guitarist Steve Winwood and Family bassist Ric Grech. The group recorded one studio album before disbanding less than a year after formation.  Also in 1968 Jack Bruce joined the Tony Williams Lifetime, composed of bassist and vocalist Bruce, and three famous Miles Davis alumni: drummer Tony Williams, guitarist John McLaughlin, and keyboardist Khalid Yasin (né Larry Young).

The term may have come from the 1968 album Super Session with Al Kooper, Mike Bloomfield, and Stephen Stills. The coalition of Crosby, Stills & Nash (later Crosby, Stills, Nash & Young) in 1969 is another early example, given the success of their prior bands (The Byrds, Buffalo Springfield, and The Hollies respectively).

Criticism
In 1974, a Time magazine article titled "Return of a Supergroup" quipped that the supergroup was a "potent but short-lived rock phenomenon" which was an "amalgam formed by the talented malcontents of other bands." The article acknowledged that groups such as Cream and Blind Faith "played enormous arenas and made megabucks, and sometimes megamusic", with the performances "fueled by dueling egos." However, while this "musical infighting built up the excitement ... it also made breakups inevitable."

See also
All-star
List of musical supergroups
Superteams in the National Basketball Association, a similar concept in professional basketball

References

 
1960s neologisms
Music-related neologisms
Musical terminology